Noszlop is a village in Veszprém county, Hungary. Original names are Nuztupe, Nuztup, Noslop.

External links 
 Street map (Hungarian)

Populated places in Veszprém County